The skillet skate (Dactylobatus armatus) is a small-bodied, deepwater skate in the family Rajidae.

Distribution and habitat
Found in the western central Atlantic, its range extends from South Carolina to southern Florida, the northern Gulf of Mexico, and the Caribbean coasts of Nicaragua and northern South America.

Description

The skillet skate is a small skate. Its total length is up to 32 cm. Its body is narrow and features a spatula-shaped lobe from the margin of each pectoral muscle. On the underside of the frontal disc, the skate displays characteristic spines.

Relationship to humans

This species is assessed as least concern.

References

Rajiformes
Fish of the Atlantic Ocean
Fish described in 1909